Safadasht (also Romanized as Şafādasht) is a village in Cheshmeh Sar Rural District, in the Central District of Khansar County, Isfahan Province, Iran. At the 2006 census, its population was 80, in 27 families.

References 

Populated places in Khansar County